Live at The Junction is the third live DVD/video recorded by Ezio, released in 2005, featuring an appearance at The Junction, Cambridge, England in December 2005.

Track listing

All songs written by Ezio Lunedei except "Sweet Thing", written by Van Morrison, and "59 Yards", written by Boo Hewerdine.

"Steal away"
"Circus"
"Mermaid song"
"Everybody forgets sometimes"
"Deeper"
"Darkness is my friend tonight"
"Alex"
"Hotel motel"
"One more walk round the dance floor"
"Back on your own again"
"Maybe sometimes"
"Thin line"
"Shadow boxers"
"Cinderella"
"Freedom"
"Sweet Thing"
"10,000 bars"
"59 Yards"

Credits 
Ezio – guitar, vocals
Booga – guitar
Lidia Cascarino – bass
Alex Reeves – drums
Lee Russell – guitars, lap steel, percussion and organ

Production
Produced and engineered by Derek Bruce for 25th Frame Productions
Recorded and mixed by Graham Bonnett
Cameras - Wayne Mottershead, Stephen Huntley and Neil McKinnon
Stage technician - Mark Dyde
FOH Sound - Graham Bonnett
Artwork - Nick Oliver

See also
2005 in music

Ezio (band) video albums
Live video albums
2005 live albums
2005 video albums